The Fontana del Pianto, also known as the Fontana di piazza delle Cinque Scole, is a monumental fountain located in the Piazza delle Cinque Scole in the rione of Regola in Rome.

Name
The fountain presently takes its name from the church of Santa Maria del Pianto, whose southern entrance is located a few yards north. The fountain was moved here in 1930 under Pope Pius XI, from its prior location inside the former Roman Ghetto. It was located a few more yards north, near the northern entrance to the church of Santa Maria del Pianto.

Design
The design of the marble fountain was commissioned by Pope Gregory XIII and is attributed to Giacomo della Porta, and completed by Pietro Gucci circa 1591–1593. It consists of a superior and lower basins with mascarons as spouts. The prior location, where the Via Santa Maria del Pianto becomes Via del Portico d'Ottavia, is marked in the street with white bricks. The fountain shares features, such as mascarons and simple basins with another of Della Porta's fountains: the Fontana di Piazza d'Aracoeli.

References

External links
 

Pianto
Rome R. VII Regola
Buildings and structures completed in the 16th century
Renaissance architecture in Rome